UHC Zugerland is a Swiss floorball club from the canton of Zug. UHC Zugerland's first team plays in the National League B.

Stadium 
The team plays in the sports hall Röhrliberg in Cham.

Players 

as of 5 February 2016.

References 

Zug
Swiss floorball teams